Nabakanta Barua (29 December 1926 – 14 July 2002) was a prominent Assamese novelist and poet. He was also known as Ekhud Kokaideu. As Sima Dutta he wrote many poems in his early life.

Biography

Early life
Nabakanta Barua was born 29 December 1926 in Guwahati to Nilakanta Barua, a school inspector and later teacher, and Swarnalata Baruani. He had three brothers: Devakanta, Jivakanta, and Sivakanta. Dev Kant Barua, the eldest among the brothers was the President of the Indian National Congress during the Indian Emergency (1975-1977) and served as the Governor of Bihar from 1 February 1971 to 4 February 1973. Dev Kant Barua was also a well-known poet, best known for Sagor dekhisa, a collection of Assamese poems. At first the family lived in upper Assam, then moved to Puranigudam and lastly lived in Nagaon town.

Education
He started his education at a nearby school, then joined govt. Mojolia school. In 1933 he was admitted to Nagaon govt. boys in class 3, from there he completed his matriculation in 1941. After that he got admitted to Cotton College, but he lost two years due to illness. In 1943, he went to Shantinikaton (West Bengal). In 1947 he completed his B.A. with English honors and in 1953 M. A. from Aligarh Muslim University.

Career
He worked in Uttar Pradesh at Shikohabad at A.K. college,  but the same year he had joined Jorhat's Jagannath Barooah College. In 1954 he joined Cotton College and worked there until 1964. From 1964 to 1967 he worked at Assam Madhyamik Shiksha Parisod as an officer of English education. He again joined Cotton College, retiring as a vice principal in 1984.

He served as president of Asam Sahitya Sabha's Dhing Adhibashan in 1968 and presided over Asom Sahitya Sabha's Bishwanath Chariali convention in 1990.

Death
Nabakanta Barua died on 14 July 2002.

Awards
1974: Assam Prakashan Parisod Award, Mur aru Prithibir
1975: Sahitya Akademi Award to Assamese Writers, Kokadeutar Har
1976: Padma Bhushan, Literature & Education
1993: Assam Valley Literary Award
1998: Kamal Kumari National Award

See also
 Assamese literature
 List of people from Assam
 List of Assamese-language poets
 List of Assamese writers with their pen names

References

External links
 Some writing of Nabakanta Barua at indianreview.in
  Remembering stalwarts of Assamese poetry - Navakanta Barua’s kin to pay tributes to poets associated with him on his 4th death anniversary today at telegraphindia.com.

1926 births
2002 deaths
Recipients of the Padma Bhushan in literature & education
Recipients of the Sahitya Akademi Award in Assamese
Recipients of the Gangadhar National Award
Aligarh Muslim University alumni
Assamese-language poets
Poets from Assam
Writers from Guwahati
Asom Sahitya Sabha Presidents
Recipients of the Assam Valley Literary Award
20th-century Indian poets
Indian male poets
20th-century Indian novelists
Novelists from Assam
20th-century Indian male writers
Assam Valley Literary Award